USNS Supply (T-AOE-6), ex-USS Supply (AOE-6), is the lead ship of the s. She was commissioned in 1994 and decommissioned in 2001, after which she was  transferred for service with the U.S. Military Sealift Command.

Operational history

U.S. Navy service
Supply was laid down on 24 February 1989 and was launched on 6 October 1990. She was commissioned in the United States Navy as USS Supply (AOE-6) on 26 February 1994 at Naval Air Station, North Island in San Diego, California. After her initial outfitting in San Diego, she sailed to  Norfolk, Virginia via the Panama Canal and Caribbean Sea, arriving on 7 August 1994.

Military Sealift Command service

After service in the U.S. Navy from 1994 through 2001 as USS Supply (AOE-6), she was decommissioned and her weapons systems were removed, then she was transferred on 13 July 2001 to the Military Sealift Command, which designated her USNS Supply (T-AOE-6).  Like other fast combat support ships, she is part of MSC's Naval Fleet Auxiliary Force.

In 2014, Supply put into BAE Systems Southeast Shipyards in Mobile, Alabama for repairs.

In 2017, Supply put in for repairs in Boston, Massachusetts.

On 6 May 2022, Supply conducted an underway replenishment (UNREP) with cruiser .

Al Qaeda target
USNS Supply was allegedly the target of Al Qaeda in the Indian Subcontinent (AQIS) in 2014. AQIS claimed through Twitter and other social media forums that the AQIS attack on Pakistan Navy frigate  was intended to attack USS Supply (sic). AQIS report contradicts the official Pakistan Navy account of the attack which states that the frigate was attacked by AQIS at the Naval Dockyard in Karachi. AQIS claims that PNS Zulfiqar crew were involved in the attempt to take over the ship at sea for attacking USS Supply and its unnamed naval escort.

References

External links
 

 

Supply-class fast combat support ships
1990 ships
Ships built in San Diego